Crenicichla multispinosa is a species of cichlid native to South America. It is found in the Maroni and Mana rivers of Suriname and French Guiana.

References

multispinosa
Fish of French Guiana
Fish of Suriname
Taxa named by Jacques Pellegrin
Fish described in 1903